The Church of the Epiphany, built in 1844, is an historic Episcopal church located at 1317 G Street, N.W., in Washington, D.C. It was added to the National Register of Historic Places on September 10, 1971.

The parish had been organized in 1842, and the new building consecrated in 1852. During the next five years, a tower, transepts and chancel were added. In 1858, the congregation established the Epiphany Church home to help the poor and sick. The American Civil War split the congregation. As Senator, Jefferson Davis had rented pew no. 14, and three of his children were confirmed at the church. After secession, when Davis moved to Richmond, Virginia and became the Confederacy's president, that pew was rented by Secretary of War Edwin Stanton. On March 6, 1862, President Abraham Lincoln attended the funeral of General Frederick Lander at this church, which also served as a hospital between May and December of that year.

National Register listing
Church of the Epiphany ** (added 1971 - Building - #71000996)
1317 G St., NW., Washington
Historic Significance: 	Event, Architecture/Engineering
Architect, builder, or engineer: 	Harkness, John W.
Architectural Style: 	Gothic Revival
Area of Significance: 	Religion, Architecture
Period of Significance: 	1825–1849, 1850–1874
Owner: 	Private
Historic Function: 	Religion
Historic Sub-function: 	Religious Structure
Current Function: 	Religion
Current Sub-function: 	Religious Structure

See also

List of Registered Historic Places in the District of Columbia

References

External links

 Church of the Epiphany website

Churches completed in 1844
19th-century Episcopal church buildings
American Civil War hospitals
Churches on the National Register of Historic Places in Washington, D.C.
Epiphany
Gothic Revival church buildings in Washington, D.C.
Religious organizations established in 1842
1842 establishments in Washington, D.C.